Charles James Wacker (December 8, 1883 – August 7, 1948) was a professional baseball pitcher for the Pittsburgh Pirates in 1909. He was born in Jeffersonville, Indiana and died in Evansville, Indiana.  He is buried in the Oak Hill Cemetery in Evansville, Indiana.

Career

References

Further reading

Books
 Blackburn, Tom; Meyer, Henry A. (1962). Evansville, 1812-1962. Evansville, In: Evansville Sesquicentennial Commission. p. 70. 
 Neft, David S.; Cohen, Richard M.; Neft, Michael L. (2006). "Pitchers 1901-1919 Spe-Wal".The Sports Encyclopedia: Baseball 2006. New York: St. Martin's Griffin. p. 120.
 Cava, Pete (2015). Indiana-Born Major League Baseball Players: A Biographical Dictionary, 1871-2014. Jefferson, NC: McFarland & Company. pp. 209, 210.

External links 
 Charlie Wacker Baseball Stats by Baseball Almanac at www.baseball-almanac.com
 Baseball Reference

1883 births
1948 deaths
American people of German descent
Pittsburgh Pirates players
Baseball players from Indiana
Evansville River Rats players
Milwaukee Brewers (minor league) players
Dayton Veterans players
Fort Wayne Brakies players
Burials in Indiana
People from Jeffersonville, Indiana